I Love You, Life! is a 1960 Soviet drama film directed by Mikhail Yershov.

Plot 
The film tells about Timofey Korneyev, who works in a confectionery factory and decides to join the party. One day he meets an unusual boy named Yegor, who mumbles something about God. Timofey learns that Yegor's grandfather leads the Jehovah's sect. Moreover, Grunya, who works with Timofey in the same factory, also goes to this sect. Timofey considers it necessary to free them.

Cast 
 Gennadi Vernov as Timofey Borisovich Korneyev (as G. Vernov)
 Ariadna Shengelaia as Lena Topilina (as A. Shengelaya)
 Irina Bunina as Grunya (as I. Bunina)
 Aleksey Kozhevnikov as Zhenya Sukhorukov (as A. Kozhevnikov)
 Galina Inyutina as Zinaida Mikhaylovna Topilina (as G. Inyutina)
 Vladimir Chestnokov as Pavel Nikolayevich Topilin (as V. Chestnokov)
 Vera Kuznetsova as Kseniya Grigoryevna Korneyeva (as V. Kuznetsova)
 Maya Blinova as Galysheva (as M. Blinova)
 Aleksandr Afanasev as Terentiy (as A. Afanasyev)

References

External links 
 

1960 films
1960s Russian-language films
Soviet drama films
1960 drama films